Return to Forever is the eighteenth studio album by German rock band Scorpions. It was released in Europe on 20 February 2015. The album marks the final release of the band to feature the Unbreakable-era lineup with longtime drummer James Kottak leaving the band in September 2016, who was replaced by former Motörhead drummer Mikkey Dee.

Background
In late 2011, the band started throwing ideas for further side projects. They had in mind two ideas. One was to release a film made from over 900 hours of footage from concerts different festivals, concert on Moscow's Red Square, concerts in Amazon rainforest, in front of Pyramids and Russian tour in 2002 and the other one was to release bonus track an album from unreleased songs, mainly from the period when their albums were released on vinyl which had possibility to fit only eight or nine songs.

In 2011 the band members started searching unreleased songs in their archives. They found many songs that were unreleased and some of the songs that they hadn't finished composing. These songs mainly had draft lyrics and there were also a couple of jams. Band members compiled a total of three CDs of unreleased songs and gave them to the producers Mikael Nord Andersson and Martin Hansen to choose the best ones for the album. the band entered the studio in early January and stayed in there until late March 2012. They reworked the unfinished songs from Blackout (1982), Love at First Sting (1984), Savage Amusement (1988) and Crazy World (1990) era. Those unfinished songs were recorded only as a simple demos, without a click track. The band members worked with Andersson and Hansen on total of 12 songs, with a plan on working on total of 16-18 songs and choosing the 12 best ones. They were adding new parts to the existing songs, especially the new set of lyrics in almost every song. The band recorded those songs in a modern way, but they managed to keep the feel, basic ideas, songwriting style and the arrangements as much as possible from the period when those songs were written. Songs "Rock 'n' Roll Band" and "Dancing with the Moonlight" were recorded during those sessions. Later, band paused the project because they didn't have enough time to finished it due to the rigorous touring schedule. In 2014 band had 12 songs prepared for the project with plan of releasing around 15 songs from the seventies and the eighties.

In 2010, the Scorpions announced their farewell tour. Before they retire, they wanted to release a bonus track album from leftovers from seventies and eighties just for the fans. After playing the final show in Munich in December, 2012, band planned to take a break and go on vacation. In January, 2013, MTV contacted the band and asked if they are interested in doing the MTV Unplugged album. They agreed on doing that project and turned out to be successful. That whole thing pushed back the bonus track project. As soon as they have finished the MTV Unplugged project, band immediately went back to studio to work on bonus track project. Band was listening the recordings they have already prepared for the project. They were happy with the result and Rudolf Schenker said that he has a tape with some songs that they could also use for this project. While searching for the tape, Schenker found an old ledger in which his mother enumerated the loans that his father provided to him, so he could buy all the equipment and establish the band. He looked into the book and it said: "September, 1965". He went back to the studio and told the band what he found and their manager said that it would be great idea to celebrate 50th Anniversary since they are the only German band who is 50 years in music and one of the few in the world along with The Rolling Stones, Status Quo, The Who, Beach Boys and Pink Floyd. Manager suggested to the band that they contact the promoters and see if they are interested in band doing the 50th Anniversary Tour. Then Schenker suggested that if band is going to do a 50th Anniversary Tour, then band needs to release brand new studio album. So the band went again into the listening process of bonus track material that they have already prepare and see if they can improve something, like choruses and riffs. After that, they re-recorded the old stuff and started to write new songs with the producers Mikael Nord Andersson and Martin Hansen. The result was the album Return to Forever.

Until the end of 2014, band had around 30 new written songs. When the band took the album to the record label, they've had 19 songs and they've wanted to do double album. Record label rejected the idea of the double album because they've need bonus tracks for the different markets. So band could only pick 12 songs that will go to the main track listing.

About the tracks
 "Going Out With a Bang" is a new song written by Mikael Nord Andersson and Martin Hansen. It is about triumph of friendship between band members and their surviving through all 50 years and all ups and downs in their career. Klaus Meine said: "We are still standing strong and we are going out with bang, yeah!". It is influenced a bit by blues. 
 "We Built This House" is also a new song and songwriting collaboration between Klaus Meine, Andersson and Hansen. It is about a relationship, but also about band's past fifty years, their philosophy and lessons their unusual life taught them. Klaus Meine explained: "In the end, it tells our story. We’ve built this house called Scorpions brick by brick and often quite arduously. From the first days in Hannover, the first concerts abroad, until this very day. We’ve weathered severe storms, but the house withstood everything, turned out to be wheatherproof and stable. However, building the house was never just cumbersome, but joyful as well. The joy of music, the joy of having experienced and still experiencing it all, the joy of – and the thankfulness for – the fans’ affection. We have been working hard for this dream, but we’re thankful as well for having been able to live it, and for still being able to live it today". The song has a chorus which comes after the verse and again one more chorus after the chorus.
 "Rock My Car" is a song that originates from 1985. It's about driving a fast car on the German Autobahn. Rudolf Schenker came on the idea for the song after band came home from the long tour where they were driving in planes and limousines. He just wanted to get in into his car and push the "pedal to the metal".
 "House of Cards" is a song for which Schenker wrote music in 1998/99. and then Meine wrote lyrics for it in 2001. Originally, they wanted to put this song on the live album Acoustica (2001). Lyrically, it is about love and when love turns to hate.
 "All for One" is a song about the band's philosophy and friendship. 
 "Rock 'n' Roll Band" is a song about sex, drugs and rock 'n' roll and about nightlife in Los Angeles. Meine was inspired to write lyrics when he was walking down Sunset Boulevard and when he went to all the night clubs, including Rainbow and strip clubs seeing girls dancing to the Scorpions music.
 "Catch Your Luck and Play" is a song that was written in 1986/87. and it was supposed to go on the album Savage Amusement (1988). Originally, it was called "Bite of the Snake" and almost made on the album's final track listing, but it didn't make it due to the weak chorus and weak hook line, even though it had a great opening riff. In collaboration with Andersson and Hansen, Schenker wrote a new chorus for the song. Lyrically, the song has a rock 'n' roll kind of theme. Explaining the theme of the song, Meine said: "No matter what comes my way, tomorrow is a brand new day. And we go for it".
 "Rollin' Home" is a new song. Hansen started to write lyrics for the song by himself and then, later, he and Meine finished the lyrics together. Hansen was inspired to write lyrics when Meine told him a story of how Scorpions travelled to concerts in old beat up van in the early seventies, in a period when American drummer Joe Wyman was in the band and how they had a traffic accident with the van in which they, luckily, all survived.
 "Hard Rockin' the Place" is a song that originates from the beginning of [the] eighties. It's a song that band always had on their demo CD. Band members often picked this song for their albums, but every time they tried the song, it never fit any of the albums. But with the help of the Andersson and Hansen, they found the right way it will fit on the album. 
 "Eye of the Storm" is a song that was written around 1991. The band would occasionally picked the song for their albums, including Humanity: Hour I (2007), but didn't make on this album because band was working with different composing teams and had plenty of other songs, so this song couldn't fit on it. Lyrically, [the] song is about writing a postcard home after a long tour.
 "The Scratch" is [the] last song written for the album and it was written around October 2014, right before band had finished with the recording of the album. It's a swing kind of song and it very influenced by Benny Goodman and it has 18 different guitar lines, which all of them were recorded on same day.
 "Gypsy Life" is a song that was written in 1999. and it was supposed to go on the live album Acoustica (2001). It's about a living life on the road, missing the life on the road after being at home for a longer period of time and going back on the road again. 
 "The World We Used to Know" is a political song written in 2014. It is inspired by the conflicts that happened around the world in 2014, including the ones in Gaza Strip and Ukraine. Klaus Meine explained: "I thought, we all go backwards in time, you know. And I hope we will have chance to go forward, saying right now it feels like it's a long way to go to find the world we used to know. And the world we used to know is the world we know for the past 25 years". 
 "Dancing with the Moonlight" originates from demo recorded during the Savage Amusement (1988) era called "Dancing In the Moonlight". It's a song about airplane trip that occurred on Meine's birthday in 2009 when Scorpions toured Russian Far East with Alice Cooper and Kingdom Come. While in the air, the airplane went through thunderstorm and in one moment started going down. Klaus Meine said: "I wrote the song about it "Dancing with the Moonlight", because our plane was dancing with the moonlight, going through this rough thunderstorms, but we survived.
 "When the Truth is a Lie" is a song that is in the vein of songs "China White" from Blackout (1982) and title song from the Animal Magnetism (1980). 
 "Who We Are" is a song that was written in 2014. It's in the tradition of the band The Who and with length of 2:33 it's one of the shortest songs ever written by Klaus Meine and he described this song as "nice song that you can throw in". The song features backing vocals by Andersson and Hansen and it's about relationship, but it can be also interpreted as song about songwriter partnership between Meine and Schenker.
 "Delirious" is [a] song that originates from 1984/85 and it never made on any of the Scorpions albums because it's experimental kind of a song and it has dance rhythm. It was influenced by the album Physical Graffiti (1975) by Led Zeppelin.
 "One and One Is Three" is a song that Schenker started to write on Christmas, 2012 with Scorpions's road manager Clifford Gauntlett. Gauntlett came up with title of the song and he said that title describes perfectly what synergy is. He and Schenker started to write some of lyrics in third verse. Later, Schenker finished song with his guitar technician Peter Kirkman and producers Andersson and Hansen. Lyrically, [the] song talks about that everything is possible to achieve when you truly believe in it.
 "Crazy Ride" is a song that originates from late seventies. Lyrically, [the] song is about fifty years of the Scorpions, from their early days to days of international success. Line "A nameless band back in '65" is a reference to Scorpions's original band name "Nameless" that Schenker gave back in 1965 when he established the band.

Release and promotion
On August 16, 2014 Scorpions released through their social media a promotional picture with which they announced new studio album and 50th Anniversary Tour for 2015. On December 19, 2014 band announced album title, artwork, track listing for standard, deluxe edition and iTunes version of the album. On the same day, first single "We Built This House" was released as an Instant Grat on iTunes Store and Amazon MP3. On February 19, 2015, there was a 50th Anniversary and "Return to Forever" album release party held in Hamburg. Release party was video streamed live on Scorpions official website on February 19, 2015 at 8.30 pm C.E.T. After the exclusive pre-listening of the new album together with Klaus Meine, Rudolf Schenker and Matthias Jabs, the band answered questions by fans and media partners and shared intimate insights and stories around the creation of the new record. Album was available for pre-order via Amazon and it released on February 20, 2015 as a standard album, deluxe edition containing four bonus tracks, a double heavyweight vynil and as a limited edition collector's boxset containing deluxe version of the album, an exclusive "Return to Forever" t-shirt, a 7" picture vynil single, signed autograph card, USB, fan pass and an audiobook. "Eye of the Storm" was released as a second single on May 8, 2015 worldwide, except in North America. It was released as a digital download featuring the radio edit and album version of the song. Release date for first single "We Built This House", and release date and track listing for album "Return to Forever" in North America were announced on June 16, 2015. On the same day pre-orders started for the album. First single "We Built This House" was released digitally on July 3, 2015 as an Instant Grat for the fans who pre-ordered the album on the Amazon and iTunes. In United States "We Built This House" reached No. 10 on U.S. "Classic Rock" radio chart. On July 15, 2015, lyrics video for the song premiered in North America on Rolling Stone official website. Music video for the song premiered in North America on August 11, 2015 on Eddie Trunk's official website. Announcements related to the release of the "Going Out With a Bang" single and music video in Europe were released on August 18, 2015 along with the video teaser. On August 21, 2015, "Going Out With a Bang" was released as a single in Europe. On the same day, music video for the song was released in Europe. Directed by Dennis Dirksen, music video was shot during the concerts in Barcelona, Spain, and Maidstone, England. On October 14, 2015, Guitar Player premiered music video for the "Going Out With a Bang" in North America.

On September 11, 2015 album was released in various formats, including digital, Deluxe CD and vinyl containing 19 songs. Beside the four tracks previously found on deluxe edition of the album "The World We Used to Know", "Dancing with the Moonlight", "When the Truth Is a Live" and "Who We Are", North American version of the album contains three additional exclusive bonus track "Crazy Ride", "One and One Is Three" and "Delirious". Scorpions have also launched an official D2C store with exciting offerings for fans featuring brand new t-shirt and sweatshirt designs coupled with the CD and Vinyl versions of album. Each bundle had an exclusive custom made fan poster that featured every fan's name on it who pre-ordered the album through D2C store by August 14, 2015.

Critical reception

Fred Thomas from AllMusic stated that "Return to Forever follows suit very much, with the 12 new songs here embodying the same over the top celebration and hedonistic revelry of a much younger Scorpions. At times the throwbacks are a little transparent". Ray Van Horn Jr. from Blabbermouth.net wrote about the album that "The SCORPIONS do their damnedest here, like they did on Sting in the Tail prior, to make believe they're living in a "World Wide Live" once again". Nick Hasted from Classic Rock wrote that "It’s 1984 forever for the Scorpions, a return to slick, semi-hard rock and power ballads". Arie van der Graaf from Melodic said that the Scorpions "haven't made an album as fresh as this one for years. With its razorsharp guitars, great melodic harmonies and hymns they still rule as Germany's most successful rock band, miles ahead of good followers Edguy and Rammstein". Jedd Beaudoin from PopMatters concluded its review saying "We don’t know that this will be the final Scorpions LP, but if it is, the little band from Hanover will certainly have gone out with, as they say, a bang".

Track listing

Personnel
Scorpions
 Klaus Meine – lead vocals
 Rudolf Schenker – rhythm guitar, backing vocals
 Matthias Jabs – lead guitar, backing vocals
 Paweł Mąciwoda – bass, backing vocals
 James Kottak – drums, backing vocals

Production
Mikael Nord Andersson – production, engineering, mixing
Martin Hansen – production, engineering, mixing
Tim Eckhorst – cover artwork

Charts

Weekly charts

Year-end charts

References

2015 albums
Scorpions (band) albums
Sony Music albums